Wild Rose Pass is a gap in the Davis Mountains in Jeff Davis County, Texas.

History
Wild Rose Pass was where travelers on the San Antonio-El Paso Road passed into the uplands of West Texas, bypassing a narrows in Limpia Canyon on its way to Fort Davis.

The site today
Wild Rose Pass is today along the route of Texas State Highway 17 northeast of Fort Davis, Texas.

References

Mountain passes of Texas
Landforms of Jeff Davis County, Texas
San Antonio–El Paso Road